Aquino may refer to:

 Aquino, Italy, a small town in Frosinone, Italy
 Aquino (surname), including a list of people
Aquino family, a political family in the Philippines 
Aquino, a book about Benigno Aquino, Jr. and Corazon Aquino by author Mel White